In molecular biology, housekeeping genes are typically constitutive genes that are required for the maintenance of basic cellular function, and are expressed in all cells of an organism under normal and patho-physiological conditions.  Although some housekeeping genes are expressed at relatively constant rates in most non-pathological situations, the expression of other housekeeping genes may vary depending on experimental conditions.

The origin of the term "housekeeping gene" remains obscure.  Literature from 1976 used the term to describe specifically tRNA and rRNA. For experimental purposes, the expression of one or multiple housekeeping genes is used as a reference point for the analysis of expression levels of other genes. The key criterion for the use of a housekeeping gene in this manner is that the chosen housekeeping gene is uniformly expressed with low variance under both control and experimental conditions. Validation of housekeeping genes should be performed before their use in gene expression experiments such as RT-PCR. Recently a web-based database of human and mouse housekeeping genes and reference genes/transcripts, named Housekeeping and Reference Transcript Atlas (HRT Atlas), was developed to offer updated list of  housekeeping genes and reliable candidate reference genes/transcripts for RT-qPCR data normalization. This database can be accessed at http://www.housekeeping.unicamp.br.

Housekeeping gene regulation 
Housekeeping genes account for majority of the active genes in the genome, and their expression is obviously vital to survival. The housekeeping gene expression levels are fine-tuned to meet the metabolic requirements in various tissues. Biochemical studies on transcription initiation of the housekeeping gene promoters have been difficult, partly due to the less-characterized promoter motifs and transcription initiation process.

Human housekeeping gene promoters are generally depleted of TATA-box, have high GC content and high incidence of CpG Islands. In Drosophila, where promoter specific CpG Islands are absent, housekeeping gene promoters contain DNA elements like DRE, E-box or DPE. Transcription start sites of housekeeping genes can span over a region of around 100 bp whereas transcription start sites of developmentally regulated genes are usually focused in a narrow region. Little is known about how the dispersed transcription initiation of housekeeping gene is established. There are transcription factors that are specifically enriched on and regulate housekeeping gene promoters. Furthermore, housekeeping promoters are regulated by housekeeping enhancers but not developmentally regulated enhancers.

Common housekeeping genes in humans
The following is a partial list of "housekeeping genes." For a more complete and updated list, see HRT Atlas database compiled by Bidossessi W. Hounkpe et al. The database was constructed by mining more than 12000 human and mouse RNA-seq datasets.

Gene expression

Transcription factors 

ATF1 NM_005171
ATF2 NM_001880
ATF4 Activating transcription factor 4 NM_001675
ATF6  NM_007348
ATF7 NM_001206682
ATF7IP NM_018179
BTF3 NM_001207 Homo sapiens basic transcription factor 3
E2F4 Homo sapiens E2F transcription factor 4, p107/p130-binding (E2F4), mRNA
ERH (gene) Enhancer of rudimentary homolog of drosophila (which in turn is the first enzymatic step in pyrimidine synthesis.  Regulated by MITF)
HMGB1 High mobility group box binds DNA
ILF2 Homo sapiens interleukin enhancer binding factor 2, 45kDa (ILF2), mRNA
IER2 formerly ETR101 Immediate Early Protein?
JUND Homo sapiens jun D proto-oncogene (JUND), mRNA
TCEB2 Elongin Matheo er rar

Repressors
PUF60 Homo sapiens fuse-binding protein-interacting repressor (SIAHBP1), transcript

RNA splicing

BAT1 aka DDX39B
HNRPD Homo sapiens heterogeneous nuclear ribonucleoprotein D (AU-rich element RNA
HNRPK Homo sapiens heterogeneous nuclear ribonucleoprotein K (HNRPK), transcript
PABPN1 poly(A) binding protein, nuclear 1
SRSF3 splicing factor, arginine/serine-rich

Translation factors

EIF1 aka SUI1
EIF1AD
EIF1B
EIF2A
EIF2AK1
EIF2AK3
EIF2AK4
EIF2AK1
EIF2B2
EIF2B3
EIF2B4
EIF2S2
EIF3A
EIF3B
EIF3D formerly EIF3S4
EIF3G
EIF3I
EIF3H
EIF3J
EIF3K
EIF3L
EIF3M
EIF3S5
EIF3S8
EIF4A1
EIF4A2
EIF4A3
EIF4E2
EIF4G1
EIF4G2
EIF4G3
EIF4H
EIF5
EIF5 
EIF5A 
EIF5AL1 
EIF5B 
EIF6
TUFM Tu translational elongation factor mitochondrial

tRNA synthesis

AARS  NM_001605 alanyl-tRNA synthetase 
AARS2  NM_020745 alanyl-tRNA synthetase 2, mitochondrial 
AARSD1  NM_001261434 alanyl-tRNA synthetase domain containing 1 
CARS NM_001751 cysteinyl-tRNA synthetase 
CARS2 NM_024537 cysteinyl-tRNA synthetase 2, mitochondrial (putative) 
DARS NM_001349 aspartyl-tRNA synthetase 
DARS2  NM_018122 aspartyl-tRNA synthetase 2, mitochondrial 
EARS2 NM_001083614 glutamyl-tRNA synthetase 2, mitochondrial 
FARS2  NM_006567 phenylalanyl-tRNA synthetase 2, mitochondrial 
FARSA  NM_004461 phenylalanyl-tRNA synthetase, alpha subunit 
FARSB  NM_005687 phenylalanyl-tRNA synthetase, beta subunit 
GARS  NM_002047 glycyl-tRNA synthetase 
HARS  NM_002109 histidyl-tRNA synthetase 
HARS2  NM_012208 histidyl-tRNA synthetase 2, mitochondrial 
IARS  NM_002161 isoleucyl-tRNA synthetase 
IARS2  NM_018060 isoleucyl-tRNA synthetase 2, mitochondrial 
KARS  NM_005548 Homo sapiens lysyl-tRNA synthetase (KARS), mRNA
LARS2  NM_015340 isoleucyl-tRNA synthetase 2, mitochondrial 
MARS  NM_004990 methionyl-tRNA synthetase 
MARS2  NM_138395 methionyl-tRNA synthetase 2, mitochondrial 
NARS  NM_004539 asparaginyl-tRNA synthetase 
NARS2  NM_024678 asparaginyl-tRNA synthetase 2, mitochondrial (putative) 
QARS  NM_005051 glutaminyl-tRNA synthetase 
RARS  NM_002884 arginyl-tRNA synthetase 
RARS2  NM_020320 arginyl-tRNA synthetase 2, mitochondrial 
SARS  NM_006513 Homo sapiens seryl-tRNA synthetase (SARS), mRNA
TARS  NM_152295 threonyl-tRNA synthetase 
VARS2  NM_020442 valyl-tRNA synthetase 2, mitochondrial 
WARS2  NM_015836 tryptophanyl tRNA synthetase 2, mitochondrial 
YARS  NM_003680 Homo sapiens tyrosyl-tRNA synthetase (YARS), mRNA
YARS2  NM_001040436 Homo sapiens tyrosyl-tRNA synthetase (YARS), mRNA mitochondrial

RNA binding protein
ELAVL1

Ribosomal proteins

RPL5
RPL8
RPL9
RPL10A
RPL11
RPL14
RPL25
RPL26L1
RPL27
RPL30
RPL32
RPL34
RPL35
RPL35A
RPL36AL
RPS5
RPS6 
RPS6KA3
RPS6KB1 
RPS6KB2 
RPS13
RPS19BP1 
RPS20
RPS23
RPS24
RPS27 transcribed with ubiquitin (see FAU (gene))
RPN1 Ribophorin anchors the ribosome to rough endoplasmic reticulum

Mitochondrial ribosomal proteins

MRPL9
MRPL1 
MRPL10 
MRPL11 
MRPL12 
MRPL13 
MRPL14 
MRPL15 
MRPL16 
MRPL17 
MRPL18 
MRPL19 
MRPL2 
MRPL20 
MRPL21 
MRPL22 
MRPL23
MRPL24 
MRPL27 
MRPL28 
MRPL3 
MRPL30 
MRPL32 
MRPL33 
MRPL35 
MRPL36 
MRPL37 
MRPL38 
MRPL4 
MRPL40 
MRPL41 
MRPL42 
MRPL43 
MRPL44
MRPL45 
MRPL46 
MRPL47 
MRPL48 
MRPL49 
MRPL50 
MRPL51 
MRPL52 
MRPL53
MRPL54 
MRPL55 
MRPL9 
MRPS10 
MRPS11 
MRPS12 
MRPS14 
MRPS15 
MRPS16 
MRPS17 
MRPS18A 
MRPS18B 
MRPS18C 
MRPS2 
MRPS21 
MRPS22 
MRPS23 
MRPS24 
MRPS25 
MRPS26 
MRPS27 
MRPS28 
MRPS30 
MRPS31 
MRPS33 
MRPS34 
MRPS35 
MRPS5 
MRPS6 
MRPS7 
MRPS9

RNA polymerase

POLR1C 
POLR1D 
POLR1E 
POLR2A
POLR2B 
POLR2C 
POLR2D 
POLR2E
POLR2F 
POLR2G 
POLR2H 
POLR2I 
POLR2J
POLR2K 
POLR2L
POLR3C 
POLR3E 
POLR3GL 
POLR3K

Protein processing

PPID Peptidyl-prolyl cis-trans isomerase D
PPIE Peptidyl-prolyl cis-trans isomerase E
PPIF Peptidyl-prolyl cis-trans isomerase F
PPIG Peptidyl-prolyl cis-trans isomerase G
PPIH Cyclophilin H
CANX Calnexin.  Folding of glycoproteins within endoplasmic reticulum
CAPN1 Calpain subunit
CAPN7
CAPNS1 Calpain protease subunit
NACA Nascent polypeptide associated complex alpha polypeptide
NACA2
PFDN2 Prefoldin 2
PFDN4 Prefoldin 4
PFDN5 Prefoldin 5
PFDN6 Prefoldin 6
SNX2 Sorting nexin 2
SNX3 Sorting nexin  3
SNX4 Sorting nexin 4
SNX5 Sorting nexin 5
SNX6 Sorting nexin 6
SNX9 Sorting nexin 9
SNX12 Sorting nexin 12
SNX13 Sorting nexin 13
SNX17 Sorting nexin 17
SNX18 Sorting nexin 18
SNX19 Sorting nexin 19
SNX25 Sorting nexin 25
SSR1 Translocon-associated protein TRAPA. Protein translocation in ER
SSR2 Translocon-associated protein TRAPB. Protein translocation in ER
SSR3 Translocon-associated protein TRAPG. Protein translocation in ER
SUMO1 Protein targeting
SUMO3 Protein targeting

Heat shock proteins

HSPA4 
HSPA5
HSPA8
HSPA9
HSPA14
HSBP1

Histone

HIST1H2BC
H1FX 
H2AFV 
H2AFX 
H2AFY Histone 2 Subfamily
H2AFZ essential for embryogenesis

Cell cycle
There is significant overlap in function with regards to some of these proteins.  In particular, the Rho-related genes are important in nuclear trafficking (i.e.: mitosis) as well as with mobility along the cytoskeleton in general.  These genes of particular interest in cancer research.

ARHGAP35 
ARHGAP5 
ARHGDIA 
ARHGEF10L Rho guanine nucleotide exchange factor 10L
ARHGEF11 Rho guanine nucleotide exchange factor 11
ARHGEF40 Rho guanine nucleotide exchange factor 40
ARHGEF7 Rho guanine nucleotide exchange factor 7
RAB10  NM_016131 The small GTPases Rab are key regulators of intracellular membrane trafficking, from the formation of transport vesicles to their fusion with membranes
RAB11A  NM_004663
RAB11B  NM_004218
RAB14  NM_016322
RAB18  NM_021252
RAB1A  NM_004161 Homo sapiens RAB1A, member RAS oncogene family (RAB1A), mRNA
RAB1B  NM_030981
RAB21  NM_014999
RAB22A  NM_020673
RAB2A  NM_002858
RAB2B  NM_001163380
RAB3GAP1  NM_012233
RAB3GAP2  NM_012414
RAB40C  NM_021168
RAB4A  NM_004578
RAB5A  NM_004162
RAB5B  NM_002865
RAB5C  NM_004583
RAB6A  NM_002868
RAB7A  NM_004637
RAB9A  NM_004251
RABEP1  NM_004703
RABEPK  NM_005833
RABGEF1  NM_014504
RABGGTA  NM_004581
RABGGTB  NM_004582
CENPB Centromere protein B
CTBP1 Centromere protein T
CCNB1IP1  NM_021178 E3 ubiquitin-protein ligase. Modulates cyclin B levels and participates in the regulation of cell cycle progression through the G2 phase
CCNDBP1  NM_012142 May negatively regulate cell cycle progression
CCNG1  NM_004060 May play a role in growth regulation
CCNH  NM_001239 Involved in cell cycle control and in RNA transcription by RNA polymerase II. Its expression and activity are constant throughout the cell cycle
CCNK  NM_001099402 Regulatory subunit of cyclin-dependent kinases that mediates phosphorylation of the  large subunit of RNA polymerase II
CCNL1  NM_020307 Transcriptional regulator which participates in regulating the pre-mRNA splicing process
CCNL2  NM_030937 Transcriptional regulator which participates in regulating the pre-mRNA splicing process. Also modulates the expression of critical apoptotic factor, leading to cell apoptosis.
CCNY  NM_145012 Positive regulatory subunit of the cyclin-dependent kinases CDK14/PFTK1 and CDK16. Acts as a cell-cycle regulator of Wnt signaling pathway during G2/M phase
PPP1CA  NM_002708 Protein phosphatase that associates with over 200 regulatory proteins to form highly specific holoenzymes which dephosphorylate hundreds of biological targets
PPP1CC  NM_002710 
PPP1R10  NM_002714 
PPP1R11  NM_021959 Homo sapiens protein phosphatase 1, regulatory (inhibitor) subunit 11 (PPP1R11),
PPP1R15B  NM_032833 
PPP1R37  NM_019121 
PPP1R7  NM_002712 
PPP1R8  NM_002713 
PPP2CA  NM_002715
PPP2CB  NM_001009552 
PPP2R1A  NM_014225  Negative regulator of growth and cell divisionHomo sapiens protein phosphatase 2 (formerly 2A), regulatory subunit A (PR 65),
PPP2R2A  NM_002717 
PPP2R2D  NM_018461 
PPP2R3C  NM_017917 
PPP2R4  NM_021131 
PPP2R5A  NM_006243 
PPP2R5B  NM_006244 
PPP2R5C  NM_002719 
PPP2R5D  NM_006245 
PPP2R5E  NM_006246 
PPP4C  NM_002720 
PPP4R1  NM_005134 
PPP4R2  NM_174907 
PPP5C  NM_006247 
PPP6C  NM_002721 
PPP6R2  NM_014678 
PPP6R3  NM_018312 
RAD1Homo sapiens ribonuclease/angiogenin inhibitor (RNH), mRNA
RAD17  NM_002869 Essential for sustained cell growth, maintenance of chromosomal stability, and ATR-dependent checkpoint activation upon DNA damage
RAD23B  NM_002873
RAD50  NM_005732
RAD51C  NM_002874
IST1  (locates to central dividing line of dividing cells)

Apoptosis
DAD1 Defender against cell death
DAP3 Involved in mediating interferon-gamma-induced cell death.
DAXX Death Associated Protein 6

Oncogenes
ARAF
MAZ (gene)
MYC also considered a transcription factor

DNA repair/replication
MCM3AP possibly a primase
XRCC5  NM_021141 Ku80  
XRCC6  NM_001469 Homo sapiens thyroid autoantigen: Single-stranded DNA-dependent ATP-dependent helicase. Has a role in chromosome translocation.

Metabolism

PRKAG1 Senses energy level and inactivates HMGCoA reductase and Acetyl CoA Carboxylase
PRKAA1  NM_006251 Catalytic subunit of AMP-activated protein kinase (AMPK), an energy sensor protein kinase that plays a key role in regulating cellular energy metabolism 
PRKAB1  NM_006253 Non-catalytic subunit of AMP-activated protein kinase (AMPK), an energy sensor protein kinase that plays a key role in regulating cellular energy metabolism 
PRKACA  NM_002730 Phosphorylates a large number of substrates in the cytoplasm and the nucleus. 
PRKAG1  NM_002733 Homo sapiens protein kinase, AMP-activated, gamma 1 non-catalytic subunit (PRKAG1), mRNA
PRKAR1A  NM_002734 Regulatory subunit of the cAMP-dependent protein kinases involved in cAMP signaling in cells 
PRKRIP1  NM_024653 Binds double-stranded RNA. Inhibits EIF2AK2 kinase activity (By similarity).

Carbohydrate metabolism

ALDOA
B3GALT6  NM_080605
B4GALT3  NM_003779 Homo sapiens UDP-Gal:betaGlcNAc beta 1,4- galactosyltransferase, polypeptide 3
B4GALT5  NM_004776
B4GALT7  NM_007255
GSK3A
GSK3B
TPI1
PGK1 Phosphoglycerate kinase
PGAM5
ENOPH1 Enolase phosphatase
LDHA Lactate dehydrogenase
TALDO1 Transaldolase in pentose shunt
TSTA3 Mannose metabolism

Citric Acid Cycle
SDHA NM_004168 Succinate Dehydrogenase subunit A
SDHAF2  NM_017841 
SDHB  NM_002973 Iron-sulfur protein (IP) subunit of succinate dehydrogenase (SDH) that is involved in complex II of the mitochondrial electron transport chain and is responsible for transferring electrons from succinate to ubiquinone (coenzyme Q)
SDHC  NM_003000 Membrane-anchoring subunit of succinate dehydrogenase (SDH) that is involved in complex II of the mitochondrial electron transport chain and is responsible for transferring electrons from succinate to ubiquinone (coenzyme Q).
SDHD  NM_003001

Lipid metabolism

HADHA Trifunctional protein subunit alpha

Amino acid metabolism
COMT Catechol-O-methyl transferase)

NADH dehydrogenase

NDUFA2NM_002488
NDUFA3  NM_004542
NDUFA4  NM_002489 
NDUFA5  NM_005000 
NDUFA6  NM_002490
NDUFA7 NM_005001 Homo sapiens NADH dehydrogenase (ubiquinone) 1 alpha subcomplex, 7, 14.5kDa
NDUFA8  NM_014222 
NDUFA9  NM_005002
NDUFA10  NM_004544 
NDUFA11  NM_175614 
NDUFA12  NM_018838 
NDUFA13  NM_015965
NDUFAF2  NM_174889 
NDUFAF3  NM_199069 
NDUFAF4  NM_014165
NDUFB2  NM_004546 
NDUFB3  NM_002491 
NDUFB4  NM_004547 
NDUFB5  NM_002492 
NDUFB6  NM_002493
NDUFB7 NM_004146 Homo sapiens NADH dehydrogenase (ubiquinone) 1 beta subcomplex, 7, 18kDa
NDUFB10  NM_004548 
NDUFB11  NM_019056 
NDUFB8  NM_005004 
NDUFB9  NM_005005
NDUFC1 NM_002494Homo sapiens NADH dehydrogenase (ubiquinone) 1, subcomplex unknown, 1, 6kDa 
NDUFC2  NM_004549 
NDUFC2-KCTD14  NM_001203260
NDUFS5
NDUFV2
NDUFS2  NM_004550 
NDUFS3  NM_004551 
NDUFS4  NM_002495 
NDUFS5  NM_004552 Homo sapiens NADH dehydrogenase (ubiquinone) Fe-S protein 5, 15kDa
NDUFS6  NM_004553 
NDUFS7  NM_024407 
NDUFS8  NM_002496 
NDUFV1  NM_007103 Homo sapiens NADH dehydrogenase (ubiquinone) flavoprotein 1, 51kDa (NDUFV1),
NDUFV2  NM_021074 Homo sapiens NADH dehydrogenase (ubiquinone) flavoprotein 2, 24kDa (NDUFV2),

Cytochrome C oxidase
(Note that COX1, COX2, and COX3 are mitochondrially encoded)

COX4I1 001861
COX5B NM_001862
COX6B1 NM_001863
COX6C  NM_004374
COX7A2  NM_001865 Homo sapiens cytochrome c oxidase subunit VIIa polypeptide 2 (liver) (COX7A2),
COX7A2L NM_004718
COX7C NM_001867
COX8
COX8A  NM_004074 Homo sapiens cytochrome c oxidase subunit VIII (COX8), nuclear gene encoding
COX11  NM_004375 
COX14  NM_032901 
COX15  NM_004376 
COX16  NM_016468 
COX19  NM_001031617 
COX20  NM_198076
CYC1 Homo sapiens cytochrome c-1 (CYC1)
UQCC  NM_018244 Required for the assembly of the ubiquinol-cytochrome c reductase complex (mitochondrial respiratory chain complex III or cytochrome b-c1 complex)
UQCR10  NM_013387 
UQCR11  NM_006830 Homo sapiens ubiquinol-cytochrome c reductase (6.4kD) subunit (UQCR), mRNA
UQCRB  NM_006294 
UQCRC1  NM_003365 Homo sapiens ubiquinol-cytochrome c reductase core protein I (UQCRC1), mRNA
UQCRC2  NM_003366
UQCRHL  NM_001089591 
UQCRQ  NM_014402 Homo sapiens low molecular mass ubiquinone-binding protein (9.5kD) (QP-C), mRNA

ATPase

ATP2C1  NM_014382 
ATP5A1  NM_004046 Homo sapiens ATP synthase, H+ transporting, mitochondrial F1 complex, alpha
ATP5B  NM_001686 
ATP5C1  NM_005174 
ATP5D  NM_001687 Homo sapiens ATP synthase, H+ transporting, mitochondrial F1 complex, delta
ATP5F1  NM_001688
ATP5G2  NM_005176 
ATP5G3  NM_001689 Homo sapiens ATP synthase, H+ transporting, mitochondrial F0 complex, subunit c
ATP5H  NM_006356 Homo sapiens ATP synthase, H+ transporting, mitochondrial F0 complex, subunit d
ATP5J  NM_001685 
ATP5J2  NM_004889 Homo sapiens ATP synthase, H+ transporting, mitochondrial F0 complex, subunit f,
ATP5J2-PTCD1  NM_001198879 
ATP5L  NM_006476 
ATP5O  NM_001697 Homo sapiens ATP synthase, H+ transporting, mitochondrial F1 complex, O subunit
ATP5S  NM_015684 
ATP5SL  NM_018035 
ATP6AP1  NM_001183 Homo sapiens ATPase, H+ transporting, lysosomal interacting protein 1 (ATP6IP1),
ATP6V0A2  NM_012463 
ATP6V0B  NM_004047 Homo sapiens ATPase, H+ transporting, lysosomal 21kDa, V0 subunit c (ATP6V0B),
ATP6V0C  NM_001694 Homo sapiens ATPase, H+ transporting, lysosomal 16kDa, V0 subunit c (ATP6V0C),
ATP6V0D1  NM_004691 
ATP6V0E1  NM_003945 
ATP6V1C1  NM_001695 
ATP6V1D  NM_015994 
ATP6V1E1  NM_001696 Homo sapiens ATPase, H+ transporting, lysosomal 31kDa, V1 subunit E isoform 1
ATP6V1F  NM_004231 Homo sapiens ATPase, H+ transporting, lysosomal 14kDa, V1 subunit F (ATP6V1F),
ATP6V1G1  NM_004888 Homo sapiens ATPase, H+ transporting, lysosomal 13kDa, V1 subunit G isoform 1
ATP6V1H  NM_015941 
ATPAF2  NM_145691 
ATPIF1  NM_016311

Lysosome

CTSD can degrade insulin in hepatocytes
CSTB May protect cell from leaking lysosomes
LAMP1
LAMP2
M6PR

Proteasome

PSMA1  NM_002786 
PSMA2  NM_002787 
PSMA3  NM_002788 
PSMA4  NM_002789 
PSMA5  NM_002790 
PSMA6  NM_002791 
PSMA7  NM_002792 Homo sapiens proteasome (prosome, macropain) subunit, alpha type, 7 (PSMA7),
PSMB1  NM_002793 Homo sapiens proteasome (prosome, macropain) subunit, beta type, 1 (PSMB1), mRNA
PSMB2  NM_002794 Homo sapiens proteasome (prosome, macropain) subunit, beta type, 2 (PSMB2), mRNA
PSMB3  NM_002795 
PSMB4  NM_002796 Homo sapiens proteasome (prosome, macropain) subunit, beta type, 4 (PSMB4), mRNA
PSMB5  NM_002797 
PSMB6  NM_002798 
PSMB7  NM_002799 Homo sapiens proteasome (prosome, macropain) subunit, beta type, 7 (PSMB7), mRNA
PSMC2  NM_002803 
PSMC3  NM_002804 
PSMC4  NM_006503 
PSMC5  NM_002805 
PSMC6  NM_002806 
PSMD1  NM_002807 
PSMD10  NM_002814 
PSMD11  NM_002815 Homo sapiens proteasome (prosome, macropain) 26S subunit, non-ATPase, 11
PSMD12  NM_002816 
PSMD13  NM_002817 
PSMD14  NM_005805 
PSMD2  NM_002808 
PSMD3  NM_002809 
PSMD4  NM_002810 
PSMD5  NM_005047 
PSMD6  NM_014814 
PSMD7  NM_002811 
PSMD8  NM_002812 Homo sapiens proteasome (prosome, macropain) 26S subunit, non-ATPase, 8 (PSMD8),
PSMD9  NM_002813 
PSME2 NM_002818 Homo sapiens proteasome (prosome, macropain) activator subunit 2 (PA28 beta)
PSME3  NM_005789 
PSMF1  NM_006814 
PSMG2  NM_020232 
PSMG3  NM_032302 
PSMG4  NM_001128591
UBA1  NM_003334 Homo sapiens ubiquitin-activating enzyme E1 (A1S9T and BN75 temperature
UBA2  NM_005499 
UBA3  NM_003968 
UBA5  NM_024818 
UBA52  NM_003333 
UBAC2  NM_177967 
UBALD1  NM_145253 
UBAP1  NM_016525 
UBAP2L  NM_014847 
UBB  NM_018955 Homo sapiens ubiquitin B (UBB), mRNA
UBC  NM_021009 Homo sapiens ubiquitin C (UBC), mRNA
UBE2A  NM_003336 
UBE2B  NM_003337 
UBE2D2  NM_003339 Homo sapiens ubiquitin-conjugating enzyme E2D 2 (UBC4/5 homolog, yeast)
UBE2D3  NM_003340 
UBE2D4  NM_015983 
UBE2E1  NM_003341 
UBE2E2  NM_152653 
UBE2E3  NM_006357 
UBE2F  NM_080678 
UBE2G2  NM_003343 
UBE2H  NM_003344 
UBE2I  NM_003345 Homo sapiens ubiquitin-conjugating enzyme E2I (UBC9 homolog, yeast) (UBE2I),
UBE2J1  NM_016021 
UBE2J2  NM_058167 
UBE2K  NM_005339 
UBE2L3  NM_003347 
UBE2M  NM_003969 Homo sapiens ubiquitin-conjugating enzyme E2M (UBC12 homolog, yeast) (UBE2M),
UBE2N  NM_003348 
UBE2NL  NM_001012989 
UBE2Q1  NM_017582 
UBE2R2  NM_017811 
UBE2V1  NM_021988 
UBE2V2  NM_003350 
UBE2W  NM_018299 
UBE2Z  NM_023079 
UBE3A  NM_000462 
UBE3B  NM_130466 
UBE3C  NM_014671 
UBE4A  NM_004788 
UBE4B  NM_006048
USP10  NM_005153 
USP14  NM_005151 
USP16  NM_006447 
USP19  NM_006677 
USP22  NM_015276 
USP25  NM_013396 
USP27X  NM_001145073 
USP33  NM_015017 
USP38  NM_032557 
USP39  NM_006590 
USP4  NM_003363 
USP47  NM_017944 
USP5  NM_003481 
USP7  NM_003470 
USP8  NM_005154 
USP9X  NM_001039590

Ribonuclease
RNH Ribonuclease inhibitor

Thioreductase

TXN2  NM_012473
TXNDC11  NM_015914
TXNDC12  NM_015913
TXNDC15  NM_024715
TXNDC17  NM_032731
TXNDC9  NM_005783
TXNL1  NM_004786
TXNL4A  NM_006701
TXNL4B  NM_017853
TXNRD1  NM_003330

Structural

Cytoskeletal

ANXA6
ANXA7
ARPC1A Actin-related peptide
ARPC2 
ARPC5L 
CAPZA2
CAPZB 
RHOA also implicated in regulation of cell cycle
RHOB 
RHOT1  mitochondrial trafficking
RHOT2 
TUBB Tubulin, beta polypeptide
WDR1 actin disassembly?

Organelle synthesis
A specialized form of cell signaling

BLOC1S1
BLOC1S2NM_173809
BLOC1S3NM_212550
BLOC1S4NM_018366
BLOC1S6NM_012388
AP1G1 NM_001128
AP1M1 NM_032493
AP2A1 NM_014203
AP2A2 NM_012305
AP2M1
AP2S1 NM_004069
AP3B1 NM_003664
AP3D1 NM_003938
AP3M1 NM_012095
AP3S1 NM_001284
AP3S2 NM_005829
AP4B1 NM_006594
AP5M1 NM_018229
ANXA6 Annexin 6
ANXA7 Annexin 7
AP1B1 Coated vesicles
CLTA Clathrin A (vesicles)
CLTB Clathrin B (vesicles)
CLTC

Mitochondrion
MTX2

Surface

AP2S1
CD81
GPAA1
LGALS9
MGAT2
MGAT4B
VAMP3

Cell adhesion

CTNNA1 NM_001903
CTNNB1
CTNNBIP1 NM_020248
CTNNBL1 NM_030877
CTNND1 NM_001085458 delta catenin

Channels and transporters

ABCB10 NM_012089
ABCB7 NM_004299
ABCD3 NM_002857
ABCE1 NM_002939
ABCF1 NM_001090
ABCF2 NM_005692
ABCF3 NM_018358
CALM1 Calmodulin grasps calcium ions
MFSD11 NM_024311  similar to MSFD10 aka TETRAN or tetracycline transporter-like protein
MFSD12 NM_174983
MFSD3 NM_138431
MFSD5 NM_032889 
SLC15A4  NM_145648
SLC20A1  NM_005415
SLC25A11 mitochondrial oxoglutarate/malate carrier
SLC25A26  NM_173471
SLC25A28  NM_031212
SLC25A3  NM_002635
SLC25A32  NM_030780
SLC25A38  NM_017875
SLC25A39  NM_016016
SLC25A44  NM_014655
SLC25A46  NM_138773
SLC25A5  NM_001152
SLC27A4  NM_005094
SLC30A1  NM_021194
SLC30A5  NM_022902
SLC30A9  NM_006345
SLC35A2  NM_005660
SLC35A4  NM_080670
SLC35B1  NM_005827
SLC35B2  NM_178148
SLC35C2  NM_015945
SLC35E1  NM_024881
SLC35E3  NM_018656
SLC35F5  NM_025181
SLC38A2  NM_018976
SLC39A1  NM_014437
SLC39A3  NM_144564
SLC39A7  NM_006979
SLC41A3  NM_017836
SLC46A3  NM_181785
SLC48A1  NM_017842

Receptors
ACVR1  NM_001105 similar to ACVRL1 TGF Beta receptor family Rendu-Osler-Weber syndrome
ACVR1B  NM_004302
CD23 FCER2 low affinity IgE receptor (lectin)

HLA/immunoglobulin/cell recognition
BAT1 aka DDX39B which is involved in RNA splicing
BSG Basigin Immunoglobulin Superfamily, extracellular metalloproteinase
MIF macrophage migration inhibitory factor
TAPBP

Kinases/signalling

ADRBK1 can downregulate response to epinephrine
AGPAT1 acyl 3 phosphoglycerol acyl transferase
ARF1
ARF3
ARF4
ARF5
ARL2 RAS Superfamily
CSF1 Colony stimulating factor not highly expressed constitutively at 5-12
CSK C-src tyrosine kinase
DCT dopachrome tautomerase
EFNA3
FKBP1A
GDI1 GDP Dissociation inhibitor (Rab family)
GNAS1 ubiquitously expressed, but differentially imprinted
GNAI2
HAX1 associated with tyrosine kinases
ILK Integrin linked kinase
MAPKAPK2
MAP2K2
MAP3K11
PITPNM Phosphatidylinositol transfer protein
RAC1 Ro GTPase involved with many signaling pathways
RAP1B GTPase involved with cell adhesion
RAGA Ras-related GTP Binding
STK19
STK24 Serine/Threonine Kinase
STK25
YWHAB Tyrosine 3-monooxygenase/tryptophan 5-monooxygenase activation protein, beta polypeptide
YWHAH Tyrosine 3-monooxygenase/tryptophan 5-monooxygenase activation protein, h polypeptide
YWHAQ Tyrosine 3-monooxygenase/tryptophan 5-monooxygenase activation protein, theta polypeptide
YWHAZ Tyrosine 3-monooxygenase/tryptophan 5-monooxygenase activation protein, zeta polypeptide

Growth factors
AIF1
HDGF Hepatoma derived growth factor (translocates to nucleus)
HGS
LTBP4
VEGFB
ZFP36L1

Tissue necrosis factor
CD40 formerly TNFRSF5

Casein kinase
CSNK1E
CSNK2B

Miscellaneous

ALAS1 Aminolevulinic Acid Synthase type 1 (type 2 is erythroid and associated with porphyria)
ARHGEF2 Rho guanine nucleotide exchange factor
ARMET Mesencephalic astrocyte-derived neurotrophic factor
AES amino terminal enhancer of split
BECN1 involved in autophagy and partners with PI3K
BUD31 formerly Maternal G10 transcript
Creatine kinase CKB (ATP reservoir)
Cytidine deaminase questionable: not present in very high levels at all
CPNE1
ENSA (gene)
FTH1 Heavy chain of Ferritin
GDI2 rab/ras vesicular trafficking
GUK1 Guanylate kinase transfers phosphate from ATP to GMP
HPRT Hypoxanthine-guanine phosphoribosyltransferase
IFITM1 Induced by interferon, transmembrane protein
JTB (gene) Jumping translocation breakpoint
MMPL2
NME2 (formerly NM23B) Nucleoside diphosphate kinase
NONO
P4HB
PRDX1 peroxiredoxin (reduces peroxides)
PTMA Prothymosin
RPA2 Binds DNA during replication to keep it straightened out
SULT1A3 Sulfate conjugation (note: SULT1C is cited in earlier literature as being ubiquitous  but this may be an example of different tags being used to refer to a common area of 2 closely related genes.  If the tag is too short, then it may not be specific enough to truly specify one member of a gene family from another)
SYNGR2 Synaptogyrin (may participate in vesicle translocation)
Tetratricopeptide, TTC1 small glutamine rich tetratricopeptide

Open_reading_frame
C11Orf13
C14orf2
C21orf33

Sperm/Testis
Although this page is devoted to genes that should be ubiquitously expressed, this section is for genes whose current name reflects their relative upregulation in testes

SPAG7
SRM Spermidine synthase
TEGT Bax-1 inhibitor
DAZAP2 Deleted in azoospermia
MEA1 Male enhanced antigen

See also 
Inducible gene
Genevestigator
Spatiotemporal gene expression
 Essential proteins in protein complexes
 Gene
 Genome
 Minimal genome
 List of gene families

References

External links 

 

 

Genes
Gene expression